Hīt is a district in Al Anbar Governorate, Iraq. It is centred on the city of Hīt, this district has between 75,000 and 90,000 inhabitants.

Cities
Hīt (35,000) 
Kabisa (10,000)
Al Baghdadi (15,000) 
Al Furat (4,000)
Al Mhamdy (1,000)
Al Khuthah (3,000)
Aqabah (7,000)
Azwaiha (5,000)
Jebbeh (4,000)
Hawija Heat (1,000)

Districts of Al Anbar Governorate